Hermann Peters GmbH & Co. KG was founded 1947 by Hermann Peters in Ennepetal, Germany and is globally known under the registered trademark Original PE since 1979.

The Family business is a leading spare parts and wear parts manufacturer for trucks and trailers of vehicle manufacturers such as DAF, Mercedes Benz, Iveco, MAN or BPW. The company deals also in the so-called Independent After Market with a wide product range.

History 
 1947: Foundation of the Hermann Peters KG
 1967: Management take over by Juergen Freitag (nephew of the founder) and specializing in original equipment and spare parts for trucks and trailers
 1976: Transfer of the ownership to the inheritor Juergen Freitag
 1979: Worldwide registration of the trademark Original PE
 1995: Foundation of the subsidiary company Hermann-PETERS-data GmbH
 1998: Foundation of a new technology centre for research and development, product management and quality management
 2004: Nomination of Markus Seitz as Managing Director
 2007: Installation of an own logistic center for brake drums and brake discs

Products 
The company is globally known for brake drums and brake disk for all current trucks and trailers. Furthermore, the company supplies spare and wear parts for the following product areas:
 Axle
 Brake
 engine fuel system
 exhaust system
 mirror heads / replacement mirrors
 motor cooling
 Stabilizer
 Steering
 Suspension
 Wheel mounting

External links 
 Hermann Peters Homepage

Auto parts suppliers of Germany
Automotive companies established in 1947
1947 establishments in Germany